March of Dimes Canada (MODC), officially the Rehabilitation Foundation for Disabled Persons, Canada is a registered national charity established in 2005 by Ontario March of Dimes. MODC aims to provide community-based rehabilitation services and resources across the country to people with physical disabilities.

March of Dimes in Canada has no affiliation with the American organization. Like its American counterpart, it began in 1951 with the Marching Mothers fundraising campaign to eradicate polio.

After vaccination programs effectively eliminated the threat of the disease, mandates changed to offering programs and services for people of all ages with physical disabilities, particularly in Ontario.

For many years various provincial organizations operated under the name March of Dimes as members of the Easter Seals March of Dimes National Council.

In 2005, however, Ontario March of Dimes acquired the exclusive right to use 'March of Dimes' in Canada, and now operates March of Dimes Canada as a national subsidiary. It no longer has any affiliation with Easter Seals (Canada).

March of Dimes Canada continues to work with polio survivors through Polio Canada, a national support network for people suffering from post-polio syndrome, or the late effects of polio.

It is also attempting to establish Conductive Education programs across the country, which Ontario March of Dimes imported to Canada from Europe in the 1990s.

External links
March of Dimes Canada website

Disability organizations based in Canada
Polio